is a junction passenger railway station located in the town of Shimanto, Takaoka District, Kōchi Prefecture, Japan. It is operated  the third-sector Tosa Kuroshio Railway, for which it is station number "TK27" and is also used by the Shikoku Railway Company (JR Shikoku), for which it has the station number "G27".

Lines
Wakai Station is the nominal terminus of the 77.8 kilometer JR Shikoku Yodo Line to Uwajima Station, although most trains continue past Wakai to terminate at Kubokawa Station. It is also served by the Tosa Kuroshio Railway Nakamura Line and is 4.4 kilometers from the terminus of that line at Kubokawa Station.

Layout
The station has one side platform serving one track, located on an embankment. At an unmanned station, there is a waiting area on the platform, but no station building. As mentioned above, it is a jointly used station under the jurisdiction of Tosa Kuroshio Railway, and the station name sign is Tosa Kuroshio Railway specification.

Adjacent stations

|-
!colspan=5|Tosa Kuroshio Railway

Kawaoku S.B.
Kawaoku S.B.  is a junction of Tosa Kuroshio Railway Nakamura Line and Shikoku Railway Company Yodo Line in Kawaoku, Kuroshio, Hata District, Kōchi .

The Yodo Line track divides from Nakamura Line at this junction. The track between this junction and Wakai Station is shared by two lines. The shared track and the junction are possessed by Tosa Kuroshio Railway.

Structure 

This S.B. is about 3.6 km far from Wakai Station. This S.B. is on the way of spiral of Nakamura Line between Wakai and Kaina.

Trains of both lines can pass.

One track is straightened so that the trains of Nakamura Line including limited express Nanpū can pass the S.B. without slowing down.

History 
1 March 1974 Yodo Line and this S.B. opened.
1 April 1987 Both line and the S.B. were inherited by Shikoku Railway Company.
1 April 1988 Nakamura Line and the S.B. were inherited by Tosa Kuroshio Railway.

Surrounding area
Kotohime Hachiman Shrine
Japan National Route 381
Shimanto River

See also
 List of railway stations in Japan

References

External links
Station timetable
(Kawaoku S.B.)

Railway stations in Kōchi Prefecture
Yodo Line
Railway stations in Japan opened in 1963
Shimanto, Kōchi (town)